Benidorm is a Mediterranean resort city in the region of Valencia, province of Alicante, Spain.

Benidorm may also refer to:

Place
Benidorm Island, a small island located off the coast of Benidorm

Television
Benidorm Bastards, a Belgian hidden-camera television show set in Benidorm
Benidorm (British TV series), a British comedy drama series set in Benidorm
Benidorm (Belgian TV series)

Other
Benidorm CF, a former football team based in Benidorm
Benidorm International Song Festival, a music festival that took place annually in summer in Benidorm
Benidorm Fest, a music festival that will take place in Benidorm to select the Spanish entry in the Eurovision Song Contest